Stay High may refer to:

"Stay High", a remixed version by Hippie Sabotage of Tove Lo's song "Habits (Stay High)"
"Stay High", a song by Brittany Howard from the album Jaime
"Stay High", a song by Juice WRLD from his album Legends Never Die
"Stay High", a song by Mika from his album My Name Is Michael Holbrook (2019)

See also
Stay High 149 (1950–2012) graffiti artist